David Peham (born 20 February 1992) is an Austrian professional footballer who plays as a midfielder for Grazer AK.

Club career
On 16 August 2021 he signed a three-year contract with Grazer AK.

References

External links 

1992 births 
People from Amstetten, Lower Austria
Footballers from Lower Austria
Living people
Austrian footballers
Association football midfielders
SK Vorwärts Steyr players
SKU Amstetten players
Grazer AK players
2. Liga (Austria) players